Bistra is a municipality ("općina") in Zagreb County, Croatia. The municipality was established in 1995 by separating from the former Municipality of Zaprešić and its municipal seat is Donja Bistra.

According to the 2011 Croatian census, there are 6,632 inhabitants, absolute majority of which are Croats. They live in 6 settlements/naselja:

 Bukovje Bistransko - 395
 Donja Bistra - 1,438
 Gornja Bistra - 1,836
 Novaki Bistranski - 763
 Oborovo Bistransko - 939
 Poljanica Bistranska - 1,261

References

External links 
 

Populated places in Zagreb County
Municipalities of Croatia
Zaprešić